Matěj Jurásek (born 30 August 2003) is a Czech professional football player who plays for SK Slavia Prague.

Club career 
Matěj Jurásek came through the ranks of MFK Karviná before joining Slavia Prague youth system on the summer 2018.

He made his professional debut for Slavia Prague on the 21st November 2020, coming on as a 79th minute substitute during the 6–0 league away win against SFC Opava.

Later that year he also took played in the Europa League, before choosing to join Vlašim on loan in 2021, in order to gain more experience during the second part of the season, playing in the FNL.

On 6 November 2022 Jurásek scored his first two goals for the club, at home against Banik Ostrava. He came on as a substitute after 70 minutes with the game level at 1-1. His goals, including a curling effort from outside the box, won the game for Slavia.

International career 
Matěj Jurásek is a Czech Republic youth international.

References

External links

2003 births
Living people
Czech footballers
Czech Republic youth international footballers
Association football forwards
FC Sellier & Bellot Vlašim players
Czech First League players
SK Slavia Prague players